James Deas  (1827 – 1899) was a 19th-century Scottish harbour engineer.

Life
He was born on 30 October 1827 in Edinburgh the son of James Deas (1794-1856) from Leslie in Fife and his wife, Elizabeth Cairns. From 1841 he was apprenticed to the civil engineer, John Miller, at 1 Brandfield Place.

By 1851 he was living with his parents at High Cample village in Dumfriesshire. His father, also a railway engineer,  had remarried by this stage. There were nine children in the family, presumably from both wives. Soon after James junior became Chief Engineer to the Edinburgh and Glasgow Railway Company.  In 1869, aged only 42, he was appointed Chief Engineer to the Clyde Navigation Trust in succession to John Ure. He remained in this role for 30 years, during the golden days of Clyde shipbuilding. Under his control the area of the docks was greatly increased and the depth of the River Clyde was increased by 2m for a length of 25 km.

James died of a heart attack on 29 December 1899 whilst eating lunch at Daniel Brown’s Restaurant at 79 St Vincent Street  in Glasgow. He is buried in one of the north-south rows on the upper section of the Glasgow Necropolis. His grave was sculpted by John Mossman.

Principal works
See
 (1869 and 1883)
Windmillcroft Quay (1877)
Princes Dock (1887)

Family

James was married to Isabella Orr (1839-1920).

References

1827 births
1899 deaths
Scottish civil engineers
Engineers from Edinburgh
19th-century Scottish people
British railway civil engineers
Harbour engineers
Burials at the Glasgow Necropolis